Steven "Steve" Bayliss (born 7 July 1960) is a Welsh former rugby union, and professional rugby league footballer who played in the 1970s and 1980s.

International honours
Bayliss won a cap for Wales (RL) while at St. Helens in 1981.

References

 England/Wales birth index
 Match programme - Wales vs England (8 Nov 1981)

External links
Profile at saints.org.uk

1960 births
Living people
Footballers who switched code
Lézignan Sangliers players
London Broncos players
People from Brecknockshire
Rugby union players from Powys
Rugby league centres
Rugby league players from Powys
Rugby league wingers
Rugby union centres
Rugby union players from Ystradgynlais
St Helens R.F.C. players
Wales national rugby league team players
Welsh rugby league players
Welsh rugby union players
Ystradgynlais RFC players